Terry a. O'Neal (born June 15, 1973) is an American writer. O'Neal was named one of the century's great Black women writers in a book entitled Literary Divas: The Top 100+ Most Admired African-American Women Writers in Literature (2006).

Biography 
O'Neal (Terry Anne Williams)  was born and raised on the south side of Stockton, California, where she was exposed to arts, literature, and culture by her mother, Barbara Ann Tillman-Williams. As a child, she met Maya Angelou at the art gallery where her mother worked, an experience that she later said inspired her pursuit of writing.

In 1991, she graduated from Franklin High School in Stockton. The summer following her graduation, O'Neal married at 18-years-old, and went on to attended California State University, Sacramento in the fall of 1991.

By 1997, O'Neal gave birth to three children: Michael, Jr., Cameron Henry, and Jorden Elizabeth.

Poetry had always been her first love in literature, largely inspired by her mother and her best-loved poets of the Harlem Renaissance: Langston Hughes, Carolyn M. Rodgers, and Gwendolyn Brooks, to name a few. While raising a family, attending grad school, building her own business, and working a full-time job, O'Neal decided to journey down her own path to writing; and in 2000, she released her first book of poetry, Motion Sickness.

Shortly after her first book, O'Neal released her second collection of poetry The Poet Speaks In Black (2001) and the children's picture book Ev'ry Little Soul (2002).

One year later, she published Sweet Lavender (2003), a coming-of-age story of a young girl forced to grow up too fast after her father walked out of her life at a young age. The novel, that was inspired by the works of Langston Hughes and her passion for father-daughter stories, was later adapted into a feature screenplay.

In 2005, O'Neal founded Lend Your Hand, Educating the World's Children, a non-profit organization geared towards providing resources and schools supplies needed to help students achieve academic success. Through the non-profit, she developed and implemented The Black History Bee, a program designed to teach youth Black history through a trivia competition.

Apart from her own writings, O'Neal has toured secondary schools across the country to encourage young people to carry out their dream, no matter how unlikely it may seem. It was her fervent desire to uplift today's youth that paved the way to her becoming the editor and publisher of the collection entitled Make Some Noise! A Youth Poetry Anthology, a collection that featured poetry by youth ages 12 to 18 years of age.

The latest volume Make Some Noise IV! A Baton Rouge Youth Poetry Anthology (2017) was dedicated to Louisiana youth. Through poetry, prose and short stories, they shared intimate thoughts and feelings about surviving the historic Louisiana great flood and tragic police shootings of 2016. Nearly 100 Baton Rouge teens were published in this volume.

O'Neal's contribution to uplifting youth through writing and poetry, which has largely been overlooked, has empowered youth across the United States and abroad. Her efforts have been successful in providing a safe platform for adolescence to speak out and share their voice.

In 2013, her independent film, based on the novel Sweet Lavender, went into pre-production under the title Along the Dirt Road. But the writer and producer took a hard hit following her divorce, and production was halted in the summer of 2014.

After freeing a tumultuous marriage, O'Neal released a cathartic book of poetry entitled: The Sparrow's Plight: Woes of a 21st Century Black Poet (2014). In the book, the author speaks of her run-ins with life being a Black, liberated woman in a White America, racial injustice, and the tragedies unfolding around the world. In the foreword by author and literary critic, Rudolph Lewis, he pointed out: "Neither Gil Scott-Heron nor Richard Wright could have written as poetically with such depth and beauty as Terry a O’Neal does with regard to two recent issues, namely, the tragedies of Fukishima and African child soldiers."

Works 

 Motion Sickness (2000) 
 The Poet Speaks in Black (2001)  
 Ev'ry Little Soul (2002) 
 Sweet Lavender (2003) 
 Good Mornin' Glory (2006) 
 The Sparrow's Plight: Woes of a 21st Century Black Poet (2014)

References 

1973 births
Living people
21st-century American poets
American children's writers
21st-century American women writers
African-American poets
21st-century African-American women writers
21st-century African-American writers
20th-century African-American people
20th-century African-American women